Septimer Pass (German: Septimerpass, Italian: Passo del Settimo, Romansh: Pass da Sett; elevation ) is a high mountain pass in the canton of Graubünden in the Swiss Alps between the valleys of Bregaglia (Bergell) and Surses (Oberhalbstein). It is traditionally considered the boundary between the Oberhalbstein and Albula Alps. During the Middle Ages, this, the Great St. Bernard, and the Brenner Passes were the preferred routes over the Alps for traveling emperors. The nearest inhabited localities on the approaches of the Septimer Pass are Casaccia on the south and Bivio on the north.

Already in use by the Romans, who maintained a legion camp in the pass around AD 15–16, this pass was an important trade route from Milan through Bivio to Augsburg It was easier to use than the Splügen Pass, due to the latter having the difficult gorges of the Hinterrhein River. One of the earliest mentions of a Christian hospice was the one placed at the pass itself, mentioned in 831. It was mentioned in documents for the following millennium, even though it was abandoned in the tenth century and rebuilt at the beginning of the eleventh. (The hospice was later abandoned for good in 1778.) During the Middle Ages the Septimer Pass was crucial to the temporal power of the Bishopric of Chur, whose extensive territories until the fourteenth century included Chiavenna. In 1236 the St. Gotthard Pass opened, allowing traffic from Lucerne to Milan, which diverted merchants from going through Chur. The pass further lost importance after the construction of roads over the Julier and Maloja passes.

See also
 Julier Pass and Maloja Pass, road passes in proximity of the Septimer Pass
 List of mountain passes in Switzerland

Notes

Sources

External links

Crossing Septimerpass like the Romans Switzerland Mobility

Mountain passes of Switzerland
Mountain passes of the Alps
Mountain passes of Graubünden
Bregaglia
Surses